Martín Baruc Orozco Chávez (born April 6, 1989, in Colima City, Colima) is a professional Mexican footballer who currently plays for Loros de la Universidad de Colima.

References

1989 births
Living people
Loros UdeC footballers
Ascenso MX players
Liga Premier de México players
Footballers from Colima
People from Colima City
Association footballers not categorized by position
Mexican footballers